Ollie Crowe is an Irish Fianna Fáil politician who has served as a Senator for the Industrial and Commercial Panel since April 2020.

Crowe unsuccessfully contested the 2020 general election in the Galway West constituency.

He was formerly a member of Galway City Council representing the Galway City Central local electoral area. Imelda Byrne was co-opted to Crowe's seat on Galway City Council following his election to the Seanad.

References

External links
Ollie Crowe's page on the Fianna Fáil website

Living people
Fianna Fáil senators
Members of the 26th Seanad
Politicians from County Galway
Local councillors in Galway (city)
County Galway-related lists
Year of birth missing (living people)